Song Wat Road is a historic road in the area of Bangkok's Samphanthawong district. It has its origins by separating from Chak Phet road near Chakkrawat police station and foot of Phra Pok Klao bridge on the borderline of Chakkrawat sub-district, Samphanthwong district and Wang Burapha Phirom sub-district, Phra Nakhon district, then cuts across Ratchawong road in the area near Ratchawong pier, as far as ending at Khao Lam cycle, where it combines Khao Lam and Charoen Krung roads in Talat Noi sub-district in the area known as Sieng Kong (เซียงกง) or official name Soi Wanit 2 (ซอยวานิช 2). The distance is 1,196 m (about 0.6 mi) alongside Chao Phraya river almost all the length.

The name "Song Wat" translates to "drawing by the king". It was built by King Chulalongkorn (Rama V) in 1892 after the great fire in Sampheng area. The Siamese government wanted to expand the roads and public utilities to a wider area, such as Yaowarat, etc. For Song Wat, it was from the King Chulalongkorn who wrote the line with a pencil on the map by himself. The construction was divided into two phases. The first phase starting from Chak Phet road to ends at Trok Rong Krata (now's Yaowaphanit road) in 1892, the second phase began in 1907 from Trok Rong Krata to ends at Charoen Krung road like today. 

Song Wat road then developed to function as main access to water transport in the area along the road, there are a number of minor roads and alleyways bridging with the port which served all the steamships communication between Chon Buri province, Ban Don (Surat Thani province), and Bangkok, as well as the barges running between the seaside towns and the capital. Song Wat area therefore was the main transport region of seafood, vegetables, plants and herbs the row-shophouses along both sides of the road are mostly the wholesale companies and shops doing businesses related to the vessel-transported commodities. The road also the origin of the business of many Thai Chinese millionaire families, such as Chearavanont, the owner of CP Group, Chatikavanij, Sirivadhanabhakdi, or Kanchanachoosak, etc.

Besides, there are place of worship in various religions, such as, Lao Pun Tao Kong Joss House, a joss house according by the Chinese belief, Masjid Luang Kocha Itsahak, masjid of the Islamic, or Wat Pathum Khongkha (Wat Sampheng), a Thai temple.  

 

Presently, the condition of the buildings along Song Wat is still the same as in the past when more than 100 years ago. Many of them operate traditional businesses, such as, the trading of whole grain seeds. 

Most of them considered as the early row buildings in Bangkok along the Chao Phraya river, there's beautiful three-story building decorated with stucco. On the opposite side are two-story buildings which are also beautifully decorated with stucco in flower, fruit motif and Corinthian pillars over the window frame, is the arches decorated with the colour glasses. Including the walls of some buildings in the middle phase of the road, there're also graffiti artwork from Western artists. In addition, Song Soem road (ถนนทรงเสริม), which is a separate road from Song Wat. It is considered to be the shortest road in Thailand. It is only 20 m (about 65 ft) long, ending at the pier on Chao Phraya river. The opposite side are Lhong 1919 and Wanglee House, which Lhong 1919 is an old port warehouse built with traditional Chinese architecture of the Wanglee family, including the location of the Mazu Joss House. It has been renovated to become a new tourist attraction includes a new landmark of Khlong San area in Thonburi.

See also
Bangkok's Chinatown

References

External links

Streets in Bangkok
Samphanthawong district
1892 establishments in Siam